Kasim Ahmed Sayed (born 30 November 1939) is an Iraqi wrestler. He competed in the men's freestyle featherweight at the 1960 Summer Olympics.

References

1939 births
Living people
Iraqi male sport wrestlers
Olympic wrestlers of Iraq
Wrestlers at the 1960 Summer Olympics
Sportspeople from Baghdad